Martin Paul-Hus is a Canadian film producer. He is most noted as producer of the films Eisenstein, which was a Genie Award nominee for Best Motion Picture at the 22nd Genie Awards in 2002, and Babysitter, which was a Canadian Screen Award nominee in the same category at the 11th Canadian Screen Awards in 2023.

A producer with Amérique Film, his other credits have included the films The Moving Statue (La liberté d'une statue), Puffball, Stay, Buddha's Little Finger, Slut in a Good Way (Charlotte a du fun) and Peace by Chocolate.

References

External links

Film producers from Quebec
French Quebecers
Living people